Jaime Yzaga defeated MaliVai Washington 7–6(8–6), 6–4 to win the 1992 Heineken Open singles competition. Karel Nováček was the defending champion.

Seeds
A champion seed is indicated in BOLD text while text in italics indicates the round in which that seed was eliminated.

  Karel Nováček (first round)
  Andrei Cherkasov (quarterfinals)
  Alexander Volkov (quarterfinals)
  Francisco Clavet (second round)
  Paul Haarhuis (second round)
  Wayne Ferreira (first round)
  MaliVai Washington (final)
  Renzo Furlan (first round)

Draw

Key
 Q – Qualifier
 WC – Wild card

External links
 ATP Men's Singles draw

Singles
ATP Auckland Open